Mid City (also Mid-City) is a neighborhood in Central Los Angeles, California.

Attractions include restaurants and a post office named for singer Ray Charles, who had his recording studio in Mid City. The neighborhood hosts eleven public and private schools. The K Line from north-south is proposed to serve this area.

Geography

City of Los Angeles boundaries 
The City of Los Angeles Department of Transportation has posted Mid City signage to mark the area.  City installed signs are at the following intersections (from east to west): Hoover Street and Washington Boulevard, Vermont Avenue and Pico Boulevard, Western Avenue and Pico Boulevard, Normandie Avenue and the Santa Monica Freeway, and La Brea Avenue and the Santa Monica Freeway.

Google Maps 
Google Maps outlines an area labeled "Mid City" that roughly runs from Hoover Street on the east to La Cienega Boulevard and Robertson Boulevard on the west.   The north is roughly bordered by Olympic Boulevard, and the Santa Monica Freeway is on the south.

Mapping L.A. boundaries 
The Mapping L.A. project of the Los Angeles Times states as follows:

Mid City is bounded on the north by Pico Boulevard, on the east by Crenshaw Boulevard, on the south by the Santa Monica Freeway, on the southwest by Washington and National boulevards, on the west by Robertson Boulevard and on the northwest by Cadillac Avenue and La Cienega Boulevard.

It is flanked by Carthay and Mid-Wilshire to the north, Arlington Heights to the east, Culver City and West Adams to the south, Palms to the southwest, Beverlywood to the west and Pico-Robertson to the northwest.

Ballona Creek
Three bridges in Mid-City cross over Ballona Creek, at Hauser Blvd., Burnside Ave. and Thurman Ave.

Population 

The 2000 U.S. census counted 52,197 residents in the 3.47-square-mile neighborhood—an average of 15,051 people per square mile, among the highest population densities in Los Angeles County. In 2008, the city estimated that the population had increased to 55,016. The median age for residents was 31, about average for both the city and the county.

Mid City was said to be "highly diverse" when compared to the city at large, with a diversity index of 0.637. The ethnic breakdown in 2000 was: Latinos, 45.2%; blacks, 38.3%;  whites, 9.5%; Asians, 3.9%; and others, 3.1%. Mexico (46) and El Salvador (15.6%) were the most common places of birth for the 35.1% of the residents who were born abroad, a figure that was considered average for the city and county.

The median household income in 2008 dollars was $43,711, considered average for the city. The percentage of households earning $20,000 or less was high, compared to the county at large. The average household size of 2.8 people was just about average for Los Angeles. Renters occupied 68.9% of the housing units, and home- or apartment owners the rest.

The percentages of never-married men (43.2%) and never-married women (35%) were among the county's highest. The census found 2,748 families headed by single parents, the 23.4% rate being considered high for both the city and the county.

Enclaves 
Smaller neighborhoods within Mid City include:

Reynier Village. Rocha House, the 13th Los Angeles Historic-Cultural Monument, is located in the village.
 Lafayette Square, a historic semi-gated neighborhood. It was designated by the city as a Los Angeles Historic Preservation Overlay Zone in 2000.
 Brookside
 Crestview
 Little Ethiopia
 Picfair Village
 Faircrest Heights
 La Cienega Heights
 Wellington Square
 Victoria Park
 Arlington Heights

Transportation

Electric railways (-1960s) 
Mid City was a key junction and terminus in the days of the electric railways from the early 1900s through the end of service in the 1963.

The Rimpau Loop in Mid City was an important terminus of the Los Angeles Railway ("Yellow Cars") streetcars. The Pico Blvd. city streetcar line "P" turned around here in the Rimpau Loop. From here, Santa Monica city buses ran to Downtown Santa Monica, and to this day, Pico and Rimpau is the terminus for several Santa Monica Transit lines.

Vineyard Junction in Mid City was where Pacific Electric "Red Car" lines converged. The lines ran from Downtown Los Angeles south to Venice Boulevard, then West along Venice to Vineyard Junction. From here they went along Venice Blvd. to Venice and Redondo Beach; while others went along San Vicente Blvd. northwest toward what is now West Hollywood as well as via Beverly Hills  to Santa Monica. It was the site of an accident on July 13, 1913, in which two wooden streetcars crashed into each other, with 14 people dead and 200 people injured. As a result, the Pacific Electric ordered its future cars to be made of steel, and it was recommended that signaling be introduced on the PE's lines.

Today 
As part of their long-range plans, the Los Angeles County MTA has proposed an extension of the K Line, which would place a rail transit station in Mid City. The proposed rail stop is at the intersection of Pico and San Vicente Boulevards—site of the old Vineyard Junction.

The old Vineyard Junction site is now occupied by the end terminal for the Santa Monica Big Blue Bus.

The K Line would allow Mid City residents to easy access to the city's east/west rail lines: the D Line along Wilshire Boulevard, the E Line from Downtown Los Angeles to Downtown Santa Monica, and the C Line from Norwalk to Redondo Beach and soon near LAX.

Currently, the Mid City alignment is unfunded and part of the K Line's Crenshaw Northern Extension Rail Project.

DASH Midtown serves the Mid City area.

Landmarks and attractions 

Nate Holden Performing Arts Center – Located at 4718 West Washington Boulevard, the center is the home of the Ebony Repertory Theater Company.
 The Del Mar Theater – Located at 5036 W. Pico Boulevard, the theater's blue and yellow neon facade was re-lit in 2003 as part of the non-profit "Pico Revitalization Project".
 The Comedy Union – Located at 5040 W. Pico Boulevard, The Comedy Union is a comedy club that showcases black comedians.
 Midtown Crossing, a retail power center on the site of the former large Sears store (1930s–1990s) at Pico and Rimpau
The Mint – Located at 6010 W. Pico Boulevard, The Mint is a music club that was established in 1937. Past performers include Macy Gray, The Wallflowers, and Natalie Cole.
Beth Chayim Chadashim – recognized by the Los Angeles Conservancy for its "cultural significance" as the world's first lesbian and gay synagogue
Roscoe's House of Chicken and Waffles – Local branch of the restaurant chain.
United States Post Office, Ray Charles Station – An existing post office at 4960 West Washington Boulevard was renamed in honor of singer Ray Charles in 2005.

Parks and recreation 
Gladys Jean Wesson Park, 2508 S W Blvd
Vineyard Recreation Center, 2942 Vineyard Ave
Mascot Park, Mascot Street and Pickford Street
Washington Irving Pocket Park, 4103 W. Washington Blvd
Mid City has an aquatic gym in the name of Eleanor Green Roberts Aquatic Center located on 4526 W Pico Blvd

Education 
Mid City residents aged 25 and older holding a four-year degree amounted to 16.8% of the population in 2000, about average for both the city and the county.

These are the elementary or secondary schools within the neighborhood's boundaries:

The Los Angeles Unified School District (LAUSD) operates public schools:
 Hamilton High School, 2955 Robertson Boulevard
 Saturn Street Elementary School, 5360 Saturn Street
 Los Angeles Senior High, 4650 W Olympic Blvd, Los Angeles, 90019
 Alta Loma Elementary School, 1745 Vineyard Avenue
 Shenandoah Street Elementary School, 2450 Shenandoah Street
 Virginia Road Elementary School, 2925 Virginia Rd, Los Angeles, CA 90016
 Marvin Avenue Elementary School, 2411 S Marvin Ave, Los Angeles, CA 90016
 Cienega Elementary School, 2611 S Orange Dr, Los Angeles, CA 90016
 Futuro College Preparatory Elementary School, LAUSD charter, 3838 Rosemead Avenue
 Crescent Heights Boulevard Elementary School, alternative school, 1661 South Crescent Heights Boulevard
 Los Angeles Center for Enriched Studies, alternative school, 5931 West 18th Street

Community Magnet School, an arts and humanities magnet primary school, was located in Mid City since its founding in 1977, for a period of around 25 years. It had been located in an area within the Los Angeles Center for Enriched Studies campus. By October 2002, Community Magnet had moved to its new location in Bel-Air.

Previously the community was home to the  Open Magnet Charter School, which was located on the campus of the Crescent Heights School. The Open school later moved to Westchester.
Current charter school includes Stella Middle Charter Academy

Notable residents 
 Harold Harby, Los Angeles City Council member, 1939–42, 1943–57
 Charles Bukowski, 1931–42, then returned in 1947
 Earl Sweatshirt, rapper, record producer and songwriter from Los Angeles
 Blueface, rapper, grew up in Mid City for most of his youth.

References

Notes

External links 

 
Neighborhoods in Los Angeles
Central Los Angeles
Los Angeles Historic Preservation Overlay Zones
Wilshire, Los Angeles
West Los Angeles
Westside (Los Angeles County)